The Hay'at al Arkan is the General Staff Command Building of the Syrian Armed Forces. It is located in Umayyad Square in central Damascus.

It was hit by two explosions on September 26, 2012. Some reports state that parts of the building were set on fire by the explosions.

References 

Military installations of Syria
Buildings and structures in Damascus